The Minister for Volunteering is a minister in the New South Wales Government with responsibility for hospitals and health services in regional New South Wales, Australia.

It was first established in 2007 in the Second Iemma ministry and was abolished in 2011  following the defeat of the Keneally ministry.

List of ministers

References

Volunteering